Henry Maitland Macintosh (10 June 1892 – 26 July 1918) was a Scottish track and field athlete and winner of gold medal in 4 × 100 metres relay at the 1912 Summer Olympics.

Macintosh was born in Kelso and educated at Glenalmond College and Corpus Christi College, Cambridge. A sprinter, at the Stockholm Olympic Games he was eliminated in the first round of the 100 metres and did not finish in the semi-final of the 200 metres. As the second leg in the British 4 × 100 m relay team, he won a gold medal, in spite of finishing second after United States in the semifinal. The United States was later disqualified for a fault in passing the baton – the same mistake was made in the final by the world record holder and main favourite German team.

In 1913, Macintosh served as president of the Cambridge University Athletics Club, won the Scottish title, and equaled the British record over 100 yards. He ran his last competition in 1914 and left to South Africa. After the start of World War I he was commissioned into the Argyll and Sutherland Highlanders. He died as a captain at age 26, from wounds. He was buried in Senlis French National Cemetery.

See also
 List of Olympians killed in World War I

References

1892 births
1918 deaths
People from Kelso, Scottish Borders
Sportspeople from the Scottish Borders
Scottish male sprinters
British male sprinters
Scottish soldiers
Olympic athletes of Great Britain
Olympic gold medallists for Great Britain
Athletes (track and field) at the 1912 Summer Olympics
Scottish Olympic medallists
British Army personnel of World War I
British military personnel killed in World War I
Argyll and Sutherland Highlanders officers
People educated at Glenalmond College
Alumni of Corpus Christi College, Cambridge
Medalists at the 1912 Summer Olympics
Olympic gold medalists in athletics (track and field)